Juan Bustos (December 8, 1935, Santiago – August 7, 2008) was a Chilean politician, law professor and lawyer. He served as the President of the Chamber of Deputies of Chile from March 13, 2008 until his death on August 7, 2008. He was known as an ardent opponent of the Augusto Pinochet dictatorship and the human rights abuses committed by the regime.

Bustos lived in exile for 14 years while Chile was ruled by the Pinochet military junta from 1973 until 1990. After his return he played a major role in uncovering cases of human rights abuses. Bustos, a top Chilean law professor and human rights lawyer, represented many of the families of people killed by the Pinochet government. During the Pinochet regime, nearly 3,000 people disappeared, while tens of thousands were arrested and tortured. Bustos represented the family of former Chilean Foreign Minister Orlando Letelier, an opponent of Pinochet who was killed by a car bomb in Washington D.C. in 1976. Letelier's assassination was linked to Pinochet military intelligence officials.

Bustos was first elected as a legislator in 1998 as a member of the Socialist Party of Chile. He served as President of the Chamber of Deputies of Chile on March 13, 2008, a position he held until his death in August 2008. He died before gaining congressional approval for the creation of a new institute to be tasked with investigating the disappearance of thousands of opponents of the Pinochet regime.

Bustos died of liver cancer in Santiago, Chile, on August 7, 2008, at the age of 72. He was survived by his wife and seven children.

Upon learning of Bustos's death, President Michelle Bachelet declared three days of national mourning.

References

1935 births
2008 deaths
People from Santiago
Chilean people of Spanish descent
Socialist Party of Chile politicians
Deaths from cancer in Chile 
Deaths from liver cancer
Chilean democracy activists
Chilean human rights activists
Presidents of the Chamber of Deputies of Chile
20th-century Chilean lawyers